The Luritja dialect is the language of the Luritja people, an Aboriginal Australian group indigenous to parts of the Northern Territory and Western Australia. It is one of several dialects in the Western Desert language group.

Origin and meaning of Luritja

The name luritja is thought to derive from the Arrernte word lurinya, 'foreigner'. It appears to have originally been applied by Arrernte speakers to people of the Western Desert Language group who had relocated onto Arrernte lands in the process of moving (or being moved) from remote desert areas to the region closer to Alice Springs. Over time younger generations have taken on the term as their ethnonym, possibly unaware of its origin.

Area
The Luritja lands include areas to the west and south of Alice Springs, extending around the edge of Arrernte country.  The area surrounding Papunya, including Mount Liebig is often referred to as Papunya Luritja, both in land and language, while areas to the south-east around Aputula and Maryvale are often referred to as Titjikala Luritja (Maryvale is the name of the cattle station on Titjikala land). The area around Ulpanyali and Watarrka National Park (Kings Canyon) is also referred to as Luritja country and the dialect of Luritja spoken there is referred to as Southern Luritja (it isidentical to Titjikala Luritja). The variety of Luritja spoken at Kintore is often referred to as Pintupi/Luritja.

Pintupi-Luritja

Papunya Luritja
Papunya Luritja is the variety of Luritja spoken around the community of Papunya, and also west through Mount Liebig to Kintore. Like Luritja generally, Papunya Luritja is a dialect of the Western Desert Language and is closely related to the Pintupi language of the area around Kintore and further west. Papunya Luritja has probably also been influenced by western varieties of Arrernte as well as Warlpiri.

Titjikala Luritja
This variety is also a dialect of the Western Desert Language spoken in Titjikala. While it is quite similar to Papunya Luritja, it shows notable differences probably having been derived mostly from Pitjantjatjara as well as being influenced by  Antakarinya and the more southern varieties of Arrernte.

Population
The total population of Luritja people (including Papunya Luritja) is probably in the thousands, making them the third largest of the Central Australian Aboriginal populations, behind Arrernte and Pitjantjatjara.

Artwork
The Luritja area relies heavily on the sale of artwork; Luritja artwork has a large number of famous artists and many companies that specifically cater for the sale of Luritja art. The Papunya Tula company in particular is world-renowned for its artists, most of whom reside at Papunya and Kintore.

References

Western Desert language
Luritja